USCF may refer to:

 United States Chess Federation
 United States Commodity Funds
 USA Cycling - United States Cycling Federation